The General debate of the 77th session of the United Nations General Assembly (UNGA) opened on 20 September and ran until 26 September 2022. Leaders from a number of member states addressed the UNGA.

Organisation and subjects
The order of speakers is given first to member states, then observer states and supranational bodies. Any other observer entities will have a chance to speak at the end of the debate, if they so choose. Speakers will be put on the list in the order of their request, with special consideration for ministers and other government officials of similar or higher rank. According to the rules in place for the General Debate, the statements should be in one of the United Nations official languages (Arabic, Chinese, English, French, Russian or Spanish) and will be translated and interpreted by  United Nations translators and interpreters. Each speaker is requested to provide 20 advance copies of their statements to the conference officers to facilitate translation and to be presented at the podium. The theme for this year's debate was chosen by President Csaba Kőrösi as: "Solutions through Solidarity, Sustainability and Science".

Speaking schedule
Since 1955, Brazil and the United States are the first and second countries to speak. However, U.S. President Joe Biden was scheduled to speak on 21 September, a day later than usual. Other countries follow according to a speaking schedule issued by the Secretariat.

The list of speakers is provided by both the daily UN Journal, while changes in order are also reflected by the UNGA General Debate website.

20 September

Morning session
  - Secretary-General António Guterres (Report of the UN Secretary-General)
  - 77th Session of the United Nations General Assembly - President Csaba Kőrösi (Opening statement)
  - President Jair Bolsonaro
  - President Macky Sall
  - President Gabriel Boric
  - King Abdullah II
  - President Gustavo Petro
  - President Recep Tayyip Erdoğan
  - President Sadyr Japarov
  - President Kassym-Jomart Tokayev
  - Emir Tamim bin Hamad Al Thani
  - President Yoon Suk-yeol
  - President Mario Abdo Benítez
  - President Sauli Niinistö
  - President Ignazio Cassis
  - President Zuzana Čaputová
  - President Emmanuel Macron

Evening session
  - President Xiomara Castro
  - President Bongbong Marcos
  - President Gitanas Nausėda
  - President Klaus Iohannis
  - President Luis Arce
  - President Pedro Castillo
  - President David Kabua
  - President Wavel Ramkalawan
  - President Alberto Fernández
  - President Andrzej Duda
  - President Alejandro Giammattei
  - President Félix Tshisekedi
  - President Faustin-Archange Touadéra
  - President Nayib Bukele
  - Prime Minister Fumio Kishida
  - Chancellor Olaf Scholz
  - Prime Minister Aziz Akhannouch
  - Prime Minister Mario Draghi

21 September

Morning session
  - President Muhammadu Buhari
  - President Ebrahim Raisi
  - President Ukhnaagiin Khürelsükh
  - President Paul Kagame
  - Chair of the Presidency Šefik Džaferović
  - President Chan Santokhi
  - President Joe Biden
  - President Egils Levits
  - President Guillermo Lasso
  - President Hakainde Hichilema
  - President Andry Rajoelina
  - Chairman of the Presidential Council Mohamed al-Menfi
  - President Maia Sandu
  - President Hage Geingob
  - President Borut Pahor
  - President William Ruto
  - President Ali Bongo Ondimba
  - President Irfaan Ali

Evening session
  - President Katalin Novák
  - President Alassane Ouattara
  - President Julius Maada Bio
  - President Alar Karis
  - President Nana Akufo-Addo
  - President José Maria Neves
  - King Mswati III
  - President Volodymyr Zelenskyy
  - President Aleksandar Vučić
  - Prince Albert II
  - President Charles Savarin
  - President Michel Aoun
  - Minister of International Relations Jan Lipavský
  - Minister of Foreign Affairs Bruno Rodríguez Parrilla
  - Minister of International Relations and Cooporation Naledi Pandor
  - Minister of Foreign Affairs Roberto Álvarez
  - Minister of Foreign Affairs Arnoldo André-Tinoco
  - Minister of Foreign Affairs Gustav Aitaro
  - Prime Minister Liz Truss

22 September

Morning session
  – President Mokgweetsi Masisi
  – President Mohamed Bazoum
  – President Adama Barrow
  – Chairman of the Presidential Leadership Council Rashad al-Alimi
  – President Taneti Maamau
  – President Emmerson Mnangagwa
  – President Umaro Sissoco Embaló
  – President Azali Assoumani
  – President George Weah
  – President Hassan Sheikh Mohamud
  – President Évariste Ndayishimiye
  – President Abdel Fattah al-Burhan
  – Prime Minister Yair Lapid
  – Prime Minister James Marape
  – Prime Minister Irakli Garibashvili
  – Prime Minister Jonas Gahr Støre
  – Prime Minister Mia Mottley

Evening session
  - President Lazarus Chakwera
  - President David Panuelo
  - Vice President Riek Machar
  - Vice President Philip Mpango
  - Vice President Jessica Alupo
  - Vice President Jose Gabriel Carrizo
  - Prime Minister António Costa
  - Prime Minister Nikol Pashinyan
  - Taoiseach Micheál Martin
  - Prime Minister Robert Abela
  - Prime Minister Sheikh Ahmad Nawaf Al-Ahmad Al-Sabah
  - Prime Minister Pedro Sánchez
  - Prime Minister Andrew Holness
  - Minister of International Affairs Alexander Schallenberg
  - Minister of Foreign Affairs Marcelo Ebrard
  - Minister of Foreign Affairs Abdullatif bin Rashid Al Zayani
  - Minister of Foreign Affairs Jeppe Kofod

23 September

Morning session
  - President José Ramos-Horta
  - President Paul-Henri Sandaogo Damiba
  - President Nicos Anastasiades
  - President Nikenike Vurobaravu
  - President Mahmoud Abbas
  - President of the European Council Charles Michel
  - Prime Minister Frank Bainimarama
  - Prime Minister Xavier Bettel
  - Prime Minister Mark Rutte
  - Prime Minister Manasseh Sogavare
  - Prime Minister Jacinda Ardern
  - Prime Minister Shehbaz Sharif
  - Prime Minister Hun Sen
  - Prime Minister Philip J. Pierre
  - Prime Minister Alexander De Croo
  - Prime Minister Xavier Espot Zamora
  - Prime Minister Pravind Jugnauth
  - Prime Minister Siaosi Sovaleni
  - Prime Minister Kyriakos Mitsotakis

Evening session
  - Prime Minister Gaston Browne
  - Prime Minister Mustafa Al-Kadhimi
  - Prime Minister Ismail Sabri Yaakob
  - Prime Minister Sheikh Hasina
  - Prime Minister Andrej Plenković
  - Prime Minister Fiamē Naomi Mataʻafa
  - Prime Minister Dritan Abazović
  - Prime Minister Terrance Drew
  - Prime Minister Johnny Briceño
  - Prime Minister Kausea Natano
  - Minister of Foreign Affairs Abdulla Shahid
  - Minister of Foreign Affairs Penny Wong
  - Minister of Foreign Affairs Simeón Oyono Esono
  - Minister of Foreign Affairs Dominique Hasler
  - Minister of Foreign Affairs Robert Dussey
  - Minister of Foreign Affairs Awatif Al-Tidjani Ahmed

24 September

Morning session
  - Prime Minister Philip Davis
  - Acting Prime Minister Abdoulaye Maïga
  - Prime Minister Ralph Gonsalves
  - Prime Minister Dickon Mitchell
  - Prime Minister Dimitar Kovačevski
  - Prime Minister Moeketsi Majoro
  - Prime Minister Adriano Maleiane
  - Prime Minister Edi Rama
  - Secretary of State Pietro Parolin
  - Minister of Foreign Affairs Wang Yi
  - Deputy Prime Minister Phạm Bình Minh
  - Deputy Prime Minister Saleumxay Kommasith
  - Deputy Prime Minister Don Pramudwinai
  - Deputy Prime Minister Demeke Mekonnen
  - Minister of Foreign Affairs Sergey Lavrov
  - Minister of Foreign Affairs Sirojiddin Muhriddin
  - Minister of External Affairs Subrahmanyam Jaishankar
  - Minister of Foreign Affairs Ann Linde
  - Caretaker Minister of Foreign Affairs Nikolay Milkov
  - Minister of Foreign Affairs Sameh Shoukry

Evening session
  - Minister of Foreign Affairs Jeyhun Bayramov
  - Minister of Foreign Affairs Vivian Balakrishnan
  - Minister of Foreign Affairs Vladimir Makei
  - Minister of Foreign Affairs Luca Beccari
  - Minister of Foreign Affairs Prince Faisal bin Farhan Al Saud
  - Minister of Foreign Affairs Erywan Yusof
  - Minister of Foreign Affairs Ali Sabry
  - Minister of Foreign Affairs Carlos Faria
  - Minister of Foreign Affairs Vladimir Norov
  - Minister of Foreign Affairs Amery Browne
  - Minister of Foreign Affairs Þórdís Kolbrún R. Gylfadóttir
  - Minister of Foreign Affairs Jean Victor Geneus
  - Prime Minister Bernard Gomou
  - Minister of State Reem Al Hashimi

26 September

Morning session
  - Minister of Foreign Affairs Faisal Mekdad
  - Minister of Foreign Affairs Jean-Claude Gakosso
  - Minister of Foreign Affairs Osman Saleh Mohammed
  - Minister of Foreign Affairs Francisco Bustillo
  - Minister of Foreign Affairs Ismail Ould Cheikh Ahmed
  - Minister of Foreign Affairs Retno Marsudi
  - Minister of Foreign Affairs Ramtane Lamamra
  - Minister of Foreign Affairs Denis Moncada
  - Minister of Foreign Affairs Othman Jerandi
  - Minister of Foreign Affairs Tandi Dorji
  - Minister of Foreign Affairs Mélanie Joly
  - Minister of Foreign Affairs Lejeune Mbella Mbella
  - Foreign Secretary Narayan Khadka
  - Permanent Representative Marc Gninadoou Araba
  - Permanent Representative Kim Song
  - Permanent Representative Aksoltan Ataýewa
  - Permanent Representative Maria de Jesus dos Reis Ferreira
  - Permanent Representative Mohammed Al Hassan
  - Permanent Representative Mohamed Siad Doualeh
  - Permanent Representative Josie Ann Dongobir
  - 77th Session of the United Nations General Assembly - President Csaba Kőrösi (Closing statement)

Notes

References

2022 in international relations
2022 in New York City
General debates of the United Nations General Assembly
September 2022 events in the United States